Carlo Azeglio Ciampi (9 December 1920 – 16 September 2016) was an Italian politician and banker who was the prime minister of Italy from 1993 to 1994 and the president of Italy from 1999 to 2006.

Biography

Education
Ciampi was born in Livorno (Province of Livorno). He received a B.A. in ancient Greek literature and classical philology in 1941 from the Scuola Normale Superiore di Pisa, one of the country's most prestigious universities, defending a thesis, entitled Favorino d'Arelate e la consolazione Περὶ φυγῆς, under the direction of the Hellenist Augusto Mancini. Then he was called to military duty in Albania as a lieutenant. On 8 September 1943, on the date of the armistice with the Allies, he refused to remain in the Fascist Italian Social Republic, and took refuge in Abruzzo, in Scanno. He subsequently managed to pass the lines and reach Bari, where he joined the Partito d'Azione and thus the Italian resistance movement. In 1946 he married Franca Pilla. That same year, he obtained a B.A. in law from the University of Pisa and began working at the Banca d'Italia. He also joined the CGIL (Trade Union), which he left in 1980.

Bank of Italy
In 1960, he was called to work in the central administration of the Bank of Italy, where he became Secretary General in 1973, Vice Director General in 1976, and Director General in 1978. In October 1979, he was nominated Governor of the Bank of Italy and President of the national Bureau de Change, positions he filled until 1993.

Political career
Ciampi was the first non-parliamentarian prime minister of Italy in more than 100 years. From April 1993 to May 1994 he oversaw a technical government. Later, as treasury minister from 1996 to May 1999 in the governments of Romano Prodi and Massimo D'Alema, he was credited with adopting the euro currency. He personally chose the Italian design for the 1-euro coin, whereas all others were left to a television vote among some candidates the ministry had prepared. Ciampi chose the Vitruvian man of Leonardo da Vinci, on the symbolic grounds that it represented man as a measure of all things, and in particular of the coin: in this perspective, money was at the service of man, instead of its opposite. The design also fitted very well on the bimetallic material of the coin.

According to the Italian weekly Famiglia Cristiana, in 1993 Ciampi was a member of the regular Masonic Lodge "Hermes" of Livorno which was affiliated to the Grand Orient of Italy and linked to the Rito Filosofico Italiano.

President (1999–2006)

Ciampi was elected with a broad majority, and was the second president ever to be elected at the first ballot (when there is a requirement of a two-thirds majority) in a joint session of the Chamber of Deputies, the Italian Senate and representatives of the Regions. He usually refrained from intervening directly into the political debate while serving as president. He often addressed general issues, without mentioning their connection to the current political debate, in order to state his opinion without being too intrusive. His interventions frequently stressed the need for all parties to respect the constitution and observe the proprieties of political debate. He was generally held in high regard by all political forces represented in the parliament.

The possibility of persuading Ciampi to stand for a second term as president by the election 2006 – the so-called Ciampi-bis – was widely discussed, despite his advancing age, but it was officially dismissed by Ciampi himself on 3 May 2006: "None of the past nine presidents of the Republic has been re-elected. I think this has become a meaningful rule. It is better not to infringe it". Ciampi, whose mandate was due to expired on the 18th, resigned on the 15th. His successor, Giorgio Napolitano took the oath on the same day.

As head of state of the host country, he officially declared the 2006 Winter Olympics open, on 10 February 2006. As president, Ciampi was not considered to be close to the positions of the Vatican and the Catholic Church, in a sort of alternance after the devout Oscar Luigi Scalfaro. He often praised patriotism, not always a common feeling because of its abuse by the Italian Fascist regime.

Death 
He died in Rome on 16 September 2016 at the age of 95.

Awards and honours
As President of the Italian Republic between 18 May 1999 and 15 May 2006, Ciampi held the roles of:
Head of the Order of Merit of the Italian Republic
Chief of the Military Order of Italy
Head of the Order of Merit for Labour
Head of the Order of the Star of Italian Solidarity
Head of the Order of Vittorio Veneto
Bailiff Grand Cross of Honour and Devotion of the Sovereign Military Order of Malta
Collar of the Order of Pius IX (Papal Order)
1982: Great Cross of the Order of Merit of the Italian Republic
1985:  – Commander of the Legion of Honour (France)
1986:  – Great Cross of Merit of the Federal Republic of Germany
1991: Honorary degree, University of Pavia
1993:  – Grand Cordon of the Order of the Rising Sun (Japan)
1995: Freeman of the City of Naples
1999:  – Collar of the Order of the White Rose (Finland)
2000: Gold Medal of the Jean Monnet Foundation for Europe
2000:  – Knight Grand Cross of the Order of the Bath (United Kingdom, 16 October 2000)
2000:  Knight Grand Cross of the Order of the White Eagle (Poland)
2001:  – Knight Grand Cross of the Royal Norwegian Order of St. Olav
2001: Medal of the Oriental Republic of Uruguay.
2001: Grand Cross of the Grand Order of King Tomislav ("For outstanding contribution to the promotion of friendship and development co-operation between the Republic of Croatia and the Italian Republic." – Croatia, 19 October 2001)
2001: Honorary doctorate from the University of Leipzig Faculty of Economics
2002:  – Grand Star of Honour for Services to the Republic of Austria
2002:  – Grand Cross (or 1st Class) of the Order of the White Double Cross (Slovakia)
2002:  – Grand Collar of the Order of Prince Henry (Portugal, 22 February 2002)
2002:  – Grand Cross with Collar of the Order of Merit of the Hungarian Republic
2002:  – Collar Pro Merito Melitensi of the Sovereign Military Order of Malta 
2003:  – Collar of the Order of the Star of Romania
2003:  – Honorary Recipient of the Order of the Crown of the Realm (Malaysia)
2004:  – Collar of the Order of the Cross of Terra Mariana (Estonia)
2004:  – Commander Grand Cross with Chain of the Order of Three Stars (Latvia)
(Malta, 19 May 2005) Honorary Member of the Xirka Ġieħ ir-Repubblika 
2005: Charlemagne Prize
2005:  – Grand Cross of the Order of Saint-Charles (Monaco, 13 December 2005)
March 2005: honorary Doctor of Civil Law degree form the Oxford University
  – Grand Cross of the Order of the Southern Cross (Brazil)
2008: Honorary doctorate from the Economics Faculty of the University of Augsburg
15 June 2005: honorary doctorate by the École Normale Supérieure of Paris.

References

|-

|-

External links

1920 births
2016 deaths
Action Party (Italy) politicians
Central bankers
Italian bankers
Italian life senators
Italian military personnel of World War II
Italian resistance movement members
Italian Roman Catholics
People from Livorno
Presidents of Italy
Prime Ministers of Italy
University of Pisa alumni

20th-century Italian politicians
Commandeurs of the Légion d'honneur
Honorary Knights Grand Cross of the Order of the Bath
Knights Grand Cross of the Order of Merit of the Italian Republic
Knights of the Order of Pope Pius IX
Knights of the Order of Vittorio Veneto
Governors of the Bank of Italy
Grand Collars of the Order of Prince Henry
Grand Crosses of the Order of Saint-Charles
Grand Cordons of the Order of the Rising Sun
Grand Crosses Special Class of the Order of Merit of the Federal Republic of Germany
Grand Crosses with Chain of the Order of Merit of the Republic of Hungary (civil)
Recipients of the Collar of the Order of the Cross of Terra Mariana
Recipients of the Grand Star of the Decoration for Services to the Republic of Austria
Recipients of the Military Order of Italy
Recipients of the Order of Merit for Labour
Recipients of the Order of Saint-Charles
Recipients of the Medal of the Oriental Republic of Uruguay
First Class of the Order of the Star of Romania
Recipients of the Order of the White Eagle (Poland)